December 6 is a 2003 thriller novel by American author Martin Cruz Smith.

Plot summary
In late 1941, Harry Niles owns a bar for American and European expatriates, journalists, and diplomats, in Tokyo's entertainment district, called the "Happy Paris". With only 24 hours until Japanese fighters and bombers attack Pearl Harbor, Niles has to consult with the local US ambassador, break up with a desperate lover, evade the police, escape the vengeance of an aggrieved samurai officer and leave the island, the exit points from which are all closed. Having grown up in Tokyo, Niles is fluent in the Japanese language and culture, and is highly streetwise.

Alternative title
The novel was published in England under the name Tokyo Station.

References

2003 American novels
Novels by Martin Cruz Smith
Native American novels
Fiction set in 1941
Novels set in the 1940s
Novels set in Tokyo
Japan in non-Japanese culture